Seven Ages of Britain may refer to:
 Seven Ages of Britain (2010 TV series), a 2010 BBC series
 Seven Ages of Britain (2003 TV series), a 2003 Channel 4 series